Rentina is a village and a former municipality in the Karditsa regional unit, Thessaly, Greece. Since the 2011 local government reform it is part of the municipality Sofades, of which it is a municipal unit. The municipal unit has an area of 56.968 km2. Population 295 (2011). The village has been identified as the site of the ancient city of Ctimene.

Rentina is the birthplace of Greek Prime Minister Georgios Tsolakoglou (1886-1948).

References

Populated places in Karditsa (regional unit)